40 Pounds of Trouble is a 1962 comedy film directed by Norman Jewison and starring Tony Curtis, Suzanne Pleshette, Larry Storch and Phil Silvers. It is a retelling of Damon Runyon's 1932 short story Little Miss Marker.

It marks Jewison's feature film directorial debut, after several years as a television director; it also marks Stanley Margulies' feature film producer debut, after having been executive producer on the television series Tales of the Vikings for Brynaprod. The film was shot on location at Disneyland and at Harrah's Club in Lake Tahoe, Nevada. It was the first motion picture ever to receive permission from Walt Disney to film at the amusement park. Producers Curtis and Stanley Margulies sent Disney a copy of the script and were surprised when the noted figure phoned them three days later to give his approval, with only a minor alteration to the script. It was the only released film completed by Curtis and Margulies' film production company Curtis Enterprises, as the pair would form a new company, Reynard Productions, shortly afterwards.

40 Pounds of Trouble had a limited one-day-only New Years Eve screening at select theaters across the United States, on the night of December 31, 1962. Theaters showed the film from one to three times that night in celebration of the oncoming new year. The film had its official world premiere on January 18, 1963 at the Carib-Miami-Miracle Theaters in Miami, Florida, and the next day at Harrah's Club's South Shore Room in Lake Tahoe, Nevada which Curtis and his wife Christine Kaufmann attended. The film then opened to the rest of the United States during the last week of January and first week of February 1963. It was a success and the film was nominated for a Golden Laurel Award for Top Comedy and Curtis was nominated for a Golden Laurel Award for Top Male Comedy Performance.

Plot
A casino manager (played by Tony Curtis) and his club singer, Chris Lockwood (played by Suzanne Pleshette), find their hands full when they agree to take in a troublesome young girl named Penny Piper (played by Claire Wilcox), left behind in the casino by her gambling father. The little girl hinders the manager's plans to keep his gaming licence. Penny thinks that Steve needs to get married and settle down, so she starts trying to match make, trying to set him up with Chris. Steve is still reeling from his failed first marriage and is apprehensive about another trip to the altar. The movie's culmination involves a slapstick pursuit through Disneyland.

Principal cast

Critical reception
Bosley Crowther of The New York Times summed up the film:

Wilcox has been especially praised in her scene in the courthouse.

Trivia 
One of the first films to be shot at Disneyland.

See also
 List of American films of 1962

References

External links
 
 
 

1962 comedy films
1962 directorial debut films
1962 films
American comedy films
Curtis Enterprises
Disneyland
1960s English-language films
Films directed by Norman Jewison
Films set in amusement parks
Films set in California
Films set in Nevada
Films shot in California
Films shot in Nevada
American films about gambling
Universal Pictures films
1960s American films